East Otto Union School is a historic school building located at East Otto in Cattaraugus County, New York. It was built in 1920, and functioned as a local high school from 1921 to the 1950s, after which the school was merged into the Cattaraugus Central School (now Cattaraugus-Little Valley Central School) 12 miles to the southwest.  It is a Colonial Revival style frame building that features a distinctive cupola. Since 1972, the structure has served as town hall for the town of East Otto, New York.

It was listed on the National Register of Historic Places in 2004.

References

External links
Historical marker/historic landmark for East Otto Union School in East Otto, NY

School buildings on the National Register of Historic Places in New York (state)
Colonial Revival architecture in New York (state)
School buildings completed in 1920
Buildings and structures in Cattaraugus County, New York
National Register of Historic Places in Cattaraugus County, New York
1920 establishments in New York (state)